Wanigamuni Ramesh Tarinda Mendis (born 7 July 1995) is a professional Sri Lankan cricketer who plays for the Sri Lanka cricket team. He was part of Sri Lanka's squad for the 2014 ICC Under-19 Cricket World Cup. He made his international debut for the Sri Lanka cricket team in January 2021.

Domestic career
In March 2018, he was named in Kandy's squad for the 2017–18 Super Four Provincial Tournament. The following month, he was also named in Kandy's squad for the 2018 Super Provincial One Day Tournament. In August 2018, he was named in Dambulla's squad the 2018 SLC T20 League.

He was the leading run-scorer for Moors Sports Club in the 2018–19 Premier League Tournament, with 612 runs in nine matches. He was also the leading wicket-taker for the team in the tournament, with 30 dismissals in nine matches.

In March 2019, he was named in Dambulla's squad for the 2019 Super Provincial One Day Tournament. In November 2019, he was named in Sri Lanka's squad for the 2019 ACC Emerging Teams Asia Cup in Bangladesh. In January 2020, on the opening day of the 2019–20 Premier League Tournament, Mendis scored his maiden double century in first-class cricket, making 205 runs for Moors Sports Club. He went on to convert it into his maiden triple century, finishing with 300 not out. In October 2020, he was drafted by the Dambulla Viiking for the inaugural edition of the Lanka Premier League.

In August 2021, he was named in the SLC Greens team for the 2021 SLC Invitational T20 League tournament. In November 2021, he was selected to play for the Dambulla Giants following the players' draft for the 2021 Lanka Premier League. In July 2022, he was signed by the Dambulla Giants for the third edition of the Lanka Premier League.

International career
In January 2021, he was named as a reserve player for Sri Lanka's Test matches against England. He made his Test debut for Sri Lanka, against England, on 22 January 2021. In February 2021, Mendis was named in Sri Lanka's limited overs squad for their series against the West Indies.

During the second Test against Bangladesh in 2021, Mendis claimed bowling figures of 2/86 and 4/103. He helped the debutant Praveen Jayawickrama to take wickets from the other end where Bangladesh lost the match by 202 runs. Finally Sri Lanka won the series 1–0.

In May 2021, he was named in Sri Lanka's One Day International (ODI) squad for their series against Bangladesh. He made his ODI debut for Sri Lanka on 28 May 2021, against Bangladesh, taking two wickets.

In July 2021, he was named in Sri Lanka's squad for their series against India. He made his Twenty20 International (T20I) debut on 28 July 2021, for Sri Lanka against India. On 1 October 2021, he was added to Sri Lanka's squad for the 2021 ICC Men's T20 World Cup. In December 2021, in the second match against the West Indies, Mendis took his first five-wicket haul in Test cricket.

References

External links
 

1995 births
Living people
Sri Lankan cricketers
Sri Lanka Test cricketers
Sri Lanka One Day International cricketers
Sri Lanka Twenty20 International cricketers
People from Ambalangoda
Colombo Commandos cricketers
Moors Sports Club cricketers
Dambulla Aura cricketers